Favorites in Stereo is a studio album by Jeanette MacDonald and Nelson Eddy.  The album was recorded in stereo and released by RCA Records in 1959.  For its monaural release the title was changed to Favorites in Hi-Fi.  The album peaked at number 40 on the Billboard 200 chart. It was certified Gold by the Recording Industry Association of America on October 27, 1966.

Background 
Nelson Eddy and Jeanette MacDonald were a popular romantic screen team in a series of eight motion pictures produced by Metro-Goldwyn-Mayer between 1935 and 1941. The two reunited on a 1957 broadcast of the CBS Television series The Big Record starring Patti Page.  Their performance of the "Italian Street Song" from their first film together, Naughty Marietta (1935) created a renewed interest for the team.  As a result, RCA brought them together to record Favorites in Stereo. During its making, MacDonald feared that the changing music tastes of the public would cause the album to underperform, and was pleasantly surprised about the album's success.

Reception 
The album was popular with critics and audiences, selling over one million copies. In his review of the album music critic, Bruce Eder, noted: "The results are impressive, even though both singers' voices had darkened somewhat since their heyday of the '30s – the dimensionality of stereo separation is not pushed artificially, but the division of the voices and the perspective of the orchestral accompaniments does allow for some superb listening moments, particularly on "Italian Street Song" on side one."

The Democrat and Chronicle added: "[The album] showed the two singers in peak form." Phil Sheridan for The Philadelphia Inquirer made the album his Album Choice, predicting that "young and old will embrace this album" and praised the "memorable" performances as "singing in grand style[.]"

Track listing

References
Footnotes

Bibliography

1959 albums
RCA Records albums